Ključ was a weekly panel show that aired from 2004 until 2009 on RTS - Serbia's public broadcaster. Hosted by Nataša Miljković, the show debut on May 20, 2004. It explored a single issue per episode with a panel of relevant guests.

Billed as a talk programme that "doesn't shy away from politics, but focuses more on its consequences", Ključ generated plenty of publicity early on due to a controversial episode that aired on June 10, 2004 (only the show's fourth episode ever) about the issues surrounding singer Severina Vučković's private sex video that had just surfaced, resulting in Balkans-wide frenzy in the general public and media. Few of the guests on the panel (Vedrana Rudan, Isidora Bjelica, and Rambo Amadeus) used such obscenity-laced language throughout the taping that most of the episode had to be cut out in order to be broadcast, while even the part that ended up on air contained plenty of swearing.

Ključ aired on Thursdays for the first nineteen episodes before moving to Mondays at 10pm in late November 2004.

After being on air non-stop for 4 and a half TV seasons, it went on short hiatus after the broadcast of January 19, 2009 episode. It returned some two months later on Friday, March 13, 2009 on a new day of the week. After ten episodes in the new time slot, it went off the air for the summer hiatus and never returned due to host Nataša Miljković's pregnancy. The last episode aired on May 29, 2009.

After returning from maternity leave, Miljković moved to a new job at RTS, hosting their daily morning programme Jutarnji program.

References

External links
Ključ presentation @ RTS site
Ključ Archive on Nataša Miljković Official Site

Radio Television of Serbia original programming
Serbian television talk shows
2004 Serbian television series debuts
Television shows set in Serbia
Television shows filmed in Serbia